Events from the year 1985 in Czechoslovakia.

Incumbents
President: Gustáv Husák.
Prime Minister: Lubomír Štrougal.

Events
9 May – Milán Václavík addresses a Czechoslovak Army military parade.
7 November – Prime Minister Lubomír Štrougal meets the President of Cuba, Fidel Castro, in Havana.

Popular culture

Film
How Poets Are Losing Their Illusions, directed by Dušan Klein is released.
My Sweet Little Village, directed by Jiří Menzel is released.
Give the Devil His Due, directed by Hynek Bočan, is released.
The Feather Fairy, directed by Juraj Jakubisko, is released.
Dissolved and Effused, directed by Ladislav Smoljak, is released.

Literature
Václav Havel publishes Letters to Olga.

Births
2 February – Lenka Hyková, sports shooter, winner of a silver medal at the  2004 Summer Olympics.
11 February – Šárka Záhrobská, winner of the bronze medal in women's slalom at the 2010 Winter Olympics.

Deaths
17 June – Josef Klapuch, freestyle wrestler, winner of a silver medal in wrestling at the 1936 Summer Olympics (born 1906).
26 June – Jaroslav Kožešník, scientist, chairman of the Czechoslovak Academy of Sciences  (born 1907).

References

Citations

Bibliography

Czechoslovakia
1985 in Czechoslovakia
Czechoslovakia
1980s in Czechoslovakia
Years of the 20th century in Czechoslovakia